Joan Tomàs Roca (born 17 February 1951) is an Andorran trap shooter who competed in five Summer Olympics spanning 36 years.

Tomàs started practicing shooting in 1971 and two years later he started to compete in events.

Tomàs was 25 years old when he made his first appearance in the Olympics, when he competed in the mixed trap event at the 1976 Summer Olympics in Montreal, where he scored 162 points and finished in 33rd place. At the 1980 Summer Olympics and the 1984 Summer Olympics he had his best finishes when he finished in 26th place at both Games, it was 16 years before Tomàs returned to the Olympic scene, when he competed in the trap event at the 2000 Summer Olympics, he went on to finish in 39th place out of 41 shooters, his final Olympic appearance was at the 2012 Summer Olympics in London when aged 61 years old again he competed in the trap event, he finished in 33rd place out of 34 shooters.

Tomàs was also his countries flag bearer at the 1984 Summer Olympics and the 2012 Summer Olympics.

As well as his five Olympic appearances he also competed in nine ISSF World Shooting Championships his best finish was 69th in 2003, and 15 ISSF European Shooting Championships where is best finish was 38th in 2000.

He is married with two children, and works in insurance, and shoots for the Mollet Club in Barcelona, his younger brother Esteve Tomàs competed in the giant slalom at the 1976 Winter Olympics.

References 

Shooters at the 1976 Summer Olympics
Shooters at the 1980 Summer Olympics
Shooters at the 1984 Summer Olympics
Shooters at the 2000 Summer Olympics
Shooters at the 2012 Summer Olympics
1951 births
Andorran male sport shooters
Olympic shooters of Andorra
Living people